Renocera is a genus of flies in the family Sciomyzidae. There are about eight described species in Renocera.

Species
R. amanda Cresson, 1920
R. brevis (Cresson, 1920)
R. johnsoni Cresson, 1920
R. longipes (Loew, 1876)
R. pallida (Fallén, 1820)
R. praetextata Müller, 1924
R. striata (Meigen, 1830)
R. stroblii Hendel, 1900

References

Further reading

External links

 

Sciomyzidae
Sciomyzoidea genera